"Quand je t'aime" is a 1987 song in French by Greek singer Demis Roussos. Written by Didier Barbelivien with a music composed by Pascal Auriat, it was released as a single in December 1987 and was part of Roussos' 1988 studio album Le Grec. It had suscess in France, becoming a top three hit.

Commercial performance 

"Quand je t'aime" entered the French chart at number 48 on 16 January 1988, reached a peak of number three in its 16th week, and spent a total of 27 weeks on the chart, 16 of them in the top ten. It achieved Silver status, awarded by the Syndicat National de l'Édition Phonographique. On the European Hot 100 Singles, it started at number 99 on 20 February 1988, peaked at number seven in its 13th week, and fell off the chart after 24 weeks of presence.

Track listing and formats 

 French 7-inch single

A. "Quand je t'aime" – 3:46
B. "Les oiseaux de ma jeunesse" – 4:00
 
 French 12-inch single

A. "Quand je t'aime" (Remix Club) – 5:00
B. "Les oiseaux de ma jeunesse" – 4:00

Charts and certifications

Weekly charts

Year-end charts

Certifications

References 

1987 songs
1987 singles
Demis Roussos songs
Songs written by Didier Barbelivien